Agaricus cupreobrunneus, commonly known as the brown field mushroom, is an edible mushroom of the genus Agaricus.

Description 
The spores are dark brown, elliptical, and smooth.

Distribution and habitat 
Agaricus cupreobrunneus tends to fruit in disturbed areas and grassy places, such as lawns, pastures, and roadsides. It can fruit by itself, gregariously, or in fairy rings.

Edibility
Agaricus cupreobrunneus is edible and good. Its taste is comparable to that of Agaricus campestris, but it is comparatively lacking in texture. A. cupreobrunneus is not currently cultivated on a widespread basis, but is commonly eaten by collectors in the areas in which it grows.

It does not contain the carcinogen agaritine, which appears in many other members of the genus Agaricus.

Similar species
Agaricus cupreobrunneus is similar in general appearance to a number of other Agaricus species, especially to A. campestris.  It also bears strong similarities to A. argenteus, A. augustus, A. hondensis, A. porphyrocephalus, and A. rutilescens. The only potential lookalikes of A. cupreobrunneus that are poisonous are yellow- or red-staining, or occur in much different habitats.

See also
List of Agaricus species

References

External links

cupreobrunneus
Edible fungi
Fungi described in 1939